The voters of the U.S. state of Ohio elect a lieutenant governor for a four-year term. Starting in 1978, the lieutenant governor is elected in tandem with the governor—votes earned on a governor-lieutenant governor ticket are indicated in parentheses.

Democratic primaries

General election

Notes

References

 
lieutenant gubernatorial elections